Naïma Moutchou (born 4 November 1980) is a French lawyer and politician of La République En Marche! (LREM) who has been serving as a member of the French National Assembly since the 2017 elections, representing the department of Val-d'Oise.

Early life and education
Moutchou was born to Moroccan parents who arrived in France in 1961.

From 2010, Moutchou practiced business and media law for nearly ten years. At the same time, she volunteered as a lawyer with International League against Racism and Anti-Semitism (LICRA).

Political career
Since entering parliament, Moutchou has been serving on the Committee on Legal Affairs, where she was her parliamentary group's coordinator from 2017 until 2019. In this capacity, she was the parliament's rapporteur on legislation combating fake news in November 2018.

In addition to her committee assignments, Moutchou is a member of the French-Moroccan Parliamentary Friendship Group and the French-Serbian Parliamentary Friendship Group. From 2018 until 2021, she was also one of six Assembly members who serve as judges of the Cour de Justice de la République.

After Amélie de Montchalin's appointment to the government of Prime Minister Édouard Philippe in March 2019, Moutchou briefly served as first vice chair of the LREM parliamentary group under the leadership of chairman Gilles Le Gendre; she was replaced by Marie Lebec in September 2019.

In addition to LREM, Moutchou joined the Horizons party in 2021.

Political positions
In July 2019, Moutchou voted in favor of the French ratification of the European Union’s Comprehensive Economic and Trade Agreement (CETA) with Canada.

When leading LREM member Stanislas Guerini withdrew support in 2021 for one of the party’s own candidates, Sarah Zemmahi, after she wore a hijab in a campaign poster, Moutchou criticized him for “discrimination.”

Other activities
 National Institute for Advanced Studies in Security and Justice (INHESJ), Member of the Board of Directors (2017–2020)

See also
 2017 French legislative election

References

1980 births
Living people
People from Ermont
Deputies of the 15th National Assembly of the French Fifth Republic
La République En Marche! politicians
21st-century French women politicians
Women members of the National Assembly (France)
French people of Moroccan descent
Members of Parliament for Val-d'Oise
Horizons politicians